I.D. (The International Design Magazine) was a magazine covering the art, business, and culture of design. It was published eight times a year by F+W Media.

History
I.D. was founded in 1954 as Industrial Design. The name was later abbreviated to an initialism; in the 1980s, the initials came to stand for International Design to reflect the magazine's broadened scope.

Since 1954, the magazine published the Annual Design Review, a juried design competition curated by I.D. staff and industry practitioners.

I.D. won five National Magazine Awards: three for General Excellence (1995, 1997, 1999), one for Design (1997), and one for Special Interests (2000).

The last issue of I.D. was published in January/February 2010.

In June 2011, I.D. magazine was re-launched online in partnership with Behance. The new I.D. magazine featured user-submitted designs that were curated to offer examples of innovative work happening today.

By March 2016, the magazine's website had been shut down.

References

External links

Architecture magazines
Defunct magazines published in the United States
Design magazines
Eight times annually magazines published in the United States
Industrial design
Magazines established in 1954
Magazines disestablished in 2010
Online magazines with defunct print editions
Visual arts magazines published in the United States